Hallelujah is the fourth album by Canned Heat, released in 1969.  It was re-released on CD in 2001 by MAM productions with four bonus tracks. It was the last album to feature classic lineup mark 1, as Vestine left the band prior to Future Blues.

Track listing

Side One
"Same All Over" (Canned Heat) – 2:51
 Bob Hite - lead vocals
 Alan Wilson - guitar
 Henry Vestine - guitar
 Larry Taylor - bass
 Fito De la Parra - drums
 Elliot Ingber - backing vocals
 Javier Batise- backing vocals
 Skip Diamond - backing vocals
Ernest Lane - organ, piano
"Change My Ways" (Alan Wilson) – 2:47
 Alan Wilson - lead vocals, whistling, guitar
 Henry Vestine - guitar
 Larry Taylor - bass
 Fito De la Parra - drums
"Canned Heat" (Robert Hite, Jr. – actually by Tommy Johnson) – 4:22
 Bob Hite - lead vocals
 Alan Wilson - guitar
 Henry Vestine - guitar
 Larry Taylor - bass
 Fito De la Parra - drums
"Sic 'em Pigs" (Robert Hite, Jr.; Booker T. White) – 2:41
 Bob Hite - lead vocals
 Alan Wilson - guitar
 Henry Vestine - guitar
 Larry Taylor - bass, backing vocals
 Fito De la Parra - drums
"I'm Her Man" (A. Leigh – actually by Bob Hite) – 2:55
 Bob Hite - lead vocals
 Alan Wilson - guitar, harmonica
 Henry Vestine - guitar
 Larry Taylor - bass
 Fito De la Parra - drums
 Mark Naftalin - organ, piano
"Time Was" (Alan Wilson) – 3:21
 Alan Wilson - guitar, lead vocals
 Henry Vestine - guitar
 Larry Taylor - bass
 Fito De la Parra - drums

Side Two
"Do Not Enter" (Alan Wilson) – 2:50
 Alan Wilson - guitar, lead vocals, harmonica
 Larry Taylor - bass
 Fito De la Parra - drums
"Big Fat (The Fat Man)" (Dave Bartholomew, Fats Domino; adapted by Robert Hite, Jr.) – 1:57
 Bob Hite - lead vocals, harmonica
 Alan Wilson - guitar
 Henry Vestine - guitar
 Larry Taylor - bass
 Fito De la Parra - drums
"Huautla" (V. Wolf – actually by Fito de la Parra) – 3:33
 Alan Wilson - harmonica
 Henry Vestine - guitar
 Larry Taylor - bass
 Fito De la Parra - drums
 Mike Pacheco - bongos, congas
"Get Off My Back" (Alan Wilson) – 5:10
 Alan Wilson - guitar, lead vocals
 Henry Vestine - guitar
 Larry Taylor - bass
 Fito De la Parra - drums
"Down in the Gutter, But Free" (Canned Heat) – 5:37
 Bob Hite - lead vocals
 Alan Wilson - harmonica
 Henry Vestine - bass
 Larry Taylor - guitar
 Fito De la Parra - drums
 Skip Diamond - backing vocals
 Elliot Ingber - backing vocals
 Mark Naftalin - organ, piano

Bonus tracks from 2001 CD release
"Time Was" – Single Version (Wilson) – 2:34
"Low Down" (Canned Heat) – 2:30
"Poor Moon" (Wilson) – 2:43
"Sic 'em Pigs" – Single Version (Hite, White) – 1:54

Personnel

Canned Heat
Bob Hite – vocals, harmonica (on track 8)
Alan Wilson – slide guitar, vocals, harmonica, whistling (on track 2)
Henry Vestine – lead guitar, public service announcement (on track 4), bass (on track 11)
Larry Taylor – bass, guitar (on track 11)
Fito de la Parra – drums

Additional Personnel
Ernest Lane – piano (on track 1)
Mark Naftalin – organ, piano (on tracks 5, 11)
Javier Batiz – group vocals (on track 1)
Skip Diamond – group vocals (on tracks 1, 11)
Elliot Ingber – group vocals (on tracks 1, 11)
Mike Pacheco – bongos and congas (on track 9)

Production
Produced by Skip Taylor and Canned Heat
Engineered by Richard Joseph Moore
Recorded at I. D. Sound Recorders, Hollywood, CaliforniaJanuary, February, March, April, and May, 1969

References 

 Fito De La Parra, Living The Blues. Canned Heat's story of Music, Drugs, Death, Sex and Survival (2000) 

1969 albums
Canned Heat albums
Liberty Records albums
Albums produced by Bob Hite
Albums produced by Alan Wilson (musician)
Albums produced by Henry Vestine
Albums produced by Larry Taylor
Albums produced by Adolfo de la Parra